The Constitution of the State of Illinois is the governing document of the state of Illinois. There have been four Illinois Constitutions; the fourth and current version was adopted in 1970. The current constitution is referred to as the "Constitution of Illinois of 1970" or less formally as the "1970 Constitution." The document is still referred to as the "Constitution of Illinois of 1970" even though there have been amendments to it after 1970. Important features of the 1970 Constitution include the creation of home rule powers for larger municipalities and other units of local government.

Summary
The 1970 Constitution has a preamble and 14 articles.

Article 1 is a bill of rights and contains similar provisions as the United States Bill of Rights, such as freedom of religion, freedom of speech and freedom of assembly. It also contains items not included in the United States Constitution like section 18, which prohibits discrimination based on sex and section 19, which prohibits discrimination based on physical or mental handicaps.

Article 2, Powers of the State, describes the division of powers into executive, legislative and judicial branches.

Article 3, Suffrage and Elections, describes voting qualifications, disqualifications and other election rules. Section 1 stipulates that a person must be 18 years old and a resident of the state for 30 days to vote. Section 4 provides for the Illinois General Assembly to establish rules for elections. Section 5 establishes rules for the state board of election, requiring for no political party to have a majority on the board. Section 7 provides procedures to recall the governor.

Article 4, the Legislature, provides rules for the Illinois General Assembly. Section 1 divides the assembly into two bodies, the Illinois Senate with 59 legislative districts, and the Illinois House of Representatives, with 118 representative districts. Section 2 describes the composition of the two bodies. Section 3 describes legislative redistricting procedures. Section 9 describes procedures involving executive vetoes of legislation. Section 14 describes impeachment rules, under which Governor Blagojevich was impeached in the House and removed from office after a trial in the Senate.

Article 5, the Executive, describes rules for the six state elected members, Governor, Lieutenant Governor, Attorney General, Secretary of State, Comptroller,  and Treasurer.

Article 6, the Judiciary, sets up rules for Supreme Court of Illinois, the Illinois Appellate Court, and the circuit or trial courts of Illinois.

Article 7, Local Government, provides rules for county, township, and city governments and provides them with a limited ability to pass ordinances.

Article 8, Finance, provides for financial matters including obligation of funds, budgeting, spending, and audits.

Article 9, Revenue, provides rules for various forms of taxation and state debt.

Article 10, Education, establishes the goal of free schooling through secondary education and creates a state board of education.

Article 11, Environment, grants each person the "right to a healthful environment." It sets that to be public policy and the duty of individuals to that a healthful environment is maintained.

Article 12, Militia, sets rules for the state militia: "The State militia consists of all able-bodied persons residing in the State except those exempted by law." It establishes the governor as the commander in chief of the militia and grants authority to use the militia to "enforce the laws, suppress insurrection or repel invasion."

Article 13, General provisions, establishes rules for persons holding public office. Section 5 prohibits reducing the pension benefits of public employees. Section 7 provides for public transportation and allows the General Assembly to spend money to provide it.

Article 14, Constitutional Revision, describes procedures for amending the constitution. Section 1 describes rules for constitutional conventions. This article requires that Illinois voters be asked at least every 20 years if they desire a constitutional convention. In 1988 the measure failed 900,109 votes for and 2,727,144 against the measure. 1,069,939 other voters chose neither option. In 2008, there was an effort by citizens to support a convention. Ultimately, the measure was also defeated by a wide margin, 1,493,203 votes for and 3,062,724 against from a total of 5,539,172 votes cast. 983,245 voters chose neither option.

(Source: Southwestern Illinois College. Constitution study Guide. The Illinois Constitution.)

Preamble
The preamble of the 1970 Constitution is as follows:

History

Convention of 1818
When statehood for Illinois was approved on April 18, 1818, the U.S. Congress approved the formation of a state constitution. An election for delegates to a state constitutional convention was scheduled for July 6, 1818. All white male U.S. citizens who had resided in the Illinois Territory for at least six months prior to the election, or whom were otherwise qualified to vote for representation, were permitted to vote. The main topics of the election were whether it was sensible to have a constitution at that time and, if so, whether to form it and how to select appropriate representatives to frame it. Madison, St. Clair, and Gallatin counties were allocated three delegates each, while all other counties were allocated two delegates each.

Delegates elected were to attend a meeting at Kaskaskia on August 3.  Any record of this election has been lost and it is uncertain where the subsequent meeting was held. However, John Reynolds later noted that the meeting was largely peaceful although there were questions about how to handle slavery. Delegation members were:

Bond County
Thomas Kirkpatrick, judge of the county court
Samuel G. Morse, sheriff
Madison County
Abraham Prickett, merchant
Joseph Borough, first lieutenant in the War of 1812
Benjamin Stephenson, former U.S. Representative
St. Clair County
Jesse B. Thomas, U.S. district attorney
James Lemen, Jr., Baptist minister
John Messinger, surveyor, former Indiana Territory legislator
Washington County
Andrew Bankson, colonel in the War of 1812
John K. Mangham, died shortly after arrival and otherwise unknown
Monroe County
Caldwell Cairns, physician and former judge of the St. Clair County court
Enoch Moore, captain in the War of 1812, county judge of probate
Randolph County
Elias Kane, judge of the Illinois Territory Eastern Circuit
George Fisher, physician, sheriff, former Indiana Territory and Illinois Territory legislator
Jackson County
Conrad Will, salt manufacturer
James Hall, War of 1812 veteran
Johnson County
William McFatridge, justice of the peace
Hezeziah West, Veteran of the Revolutionary War (Camden District, South Carolina)
Union County
John Whiteaker, jurist
William Echols, unknown origin
Pope County
Samuel Omelveny, county treasurer, produce transporter
Hamlet Ferguson, sheriff, militia captain
Franklin County
Thomas Roberts, captain in the War of 1812
Isham Harrison, unknown origin
Galltin County
Michael Jones, former Kaskaskia land official
Leonard White, salt trader, colonel of the Illinois Militia
Adolphus F. Hubbard, politician
White County
Willis Hargrave, Illinois Territory legislator, salt trader, captain in the War of 1812
William McHenry, captain in the War of 1812
Edwards County
Seth Gard, judge of the county court, Illinois Territory legislator
Levi Compton, county treasurer
Crawford County
Edward N. Cullom, farmer, justice of the peace, county commissioner
Joseph Kitchell, politician

Proceedings
Jesse B. Thomas was chosen president pro tempore while T. V. W. Varick was named secretary pro tempore and Ezra Owens was named doorkeeper. Thomas was later elevated to the full presidency, William C. Greenup was named secretary, and Ezra Owen was restyled sergeant-at-arms. On August 4, Elias Kane was tasked with forming a committee to estimate the population of the territory; they found it to be 40,258, although this number seems to be exaggerated. A committee was then formed of fifteen, one from each county, to frame and report a constitution. The convention met again on the 6th and approved the draft submitted by the committee. Robert Blackwell and Elijah C. Berry of the Illinois Intelligencer were given the responsibility of printing the document. John K. Mangham died on August 11. From the 13th through the 15th, the constitution was read aloud and minor changes were made. It was re-read on the 17th; to this point, there was little debate.

On August 18, the convention discussed the matter of slavery. The majority of delegates sought a compromise between the pro-slavery group and the abolitionists. Three votes were held on the matter over the remainder of the convention. Slavery was outlawed throughout most of the state, but was permitted for the Illinois Salines near Shawneetown. Furthermore, any slave currently in the state would remain a slave, though their children would become free upon reaching adulthood. Two votes were held on the seat of government, and two votes were held on the question of suffrage. The sites considered for the capital included Kaskaskia, Covington, Pope's Bluff, Hill's Ferry, and Vandalia. In its final state, most of the state constitution followed the United States Constitution, with some provisions adopted from Ohio, Indiana, and Kentucky, the original homes of many of the delegates. At its conclusion on August 26, 1818, the first Illinois Constitution was adopted.

Subsequent conventions
Succeeding constitutions were ratified in 1848, 1870 and 1970. 

In 1862 a constitutional convention was held, but the changes known as the "Copperhead constitution" were not ratified by the voters. Thomas J. Turner and Tazewell B. Tanner were delegates to an 1863 Illinois constitutional convention. A constitutional convention was held in 1920, but in 1922 the changes were rejected by voters.

The current version of the Illinois Constitution was ratified by special election on December 15, 1970,  and went into effect on July 1, 1971.  However, some provisions, such as the change in the dates for the election of constitutional officers, did not take effect for several years. Important features of the fourth Illinois Constitution include the creation of home rule powers for larger municipalities and other units of local government.

See also
 Law of Illinois

References

External links

Illinois Constitution
Understanding the Illinois Constitution, Illinois State Bar Association.

 
1818 in American law
1848 in American law
1870 in American law
1970 in American law
1970 documents
1818 in Illinois